The 33rd century BC was a century that lasted from the year 3300 BC to 3201 BC. It is impossible to precisely date events that happened around the time of this millennium and all dates mentioned here are estimates mostly based on geological and anthropological analysis. The bronze age started in the 33rd century BC.

Events

 Major climate shift possibly due to shift in solar activity. Glaciers expand, covering plants. Atmospheric temperatures fall.
 Sahara changes from a habitable region into a barren desert
 Ancient Egypt begins using clay, bone and ivory tags to label boxes, possibly an example of proto-writing
 Indus Valley civilisation (also known as Harappan civilization) begins in Harappa
c. 3300 BC: Archaeological evidence suggests the transition from Copper to Bronze took place around 3300 BC. 
c. 3300 BC: Harappan script is developed in Indus Valley
c. 3300 BC: Pictographs in Uruk
 3300 BC: to 3000 BC: Face of a woman, from Uruk (modern Warka, Iraq) is made. It is now in the Iraq Museum, Baghdad (stolen and recovered in 2003).
c. 3300 BC: The Red Temple, the first phase of the Monte d'Accoddi sanctuary in Northwest Sardinia, is built.
3300-3000 BC: Evidence of proto-Thracians or proto-Dacians in the prehistoric period. Proto-Dacian or proto-Thracian people developed from a mixture of indigenous peoples and Indo-Europeans from the time of Proto-Indo-European expansion in the Early Bronze Age

Inventions, discoveries, introductions
 The Bronze Age begins in the Fertile Crescent (Roux, 1980)
 Cattle introduced to the Nile valley
 Egyptians domesticate the wild ass of North Africa (Clutton-Brock)
 c. 3250 BC – Potter's wheel in use in Ancient Near East

 Hindu God Krishna was born 3228 BC in Mathura India

References

 
-7
-67